Karyn Garossino (born June 7, 1965 in Didsbury, Alberta) is a former Canadian ice dancer.  With her brother Rod Garossino, she competed in the 1988 Winter Olympics and won the gold medal at the 1989 Canadian Figure Skating Championships.

Competitive highlights
(with Rod Garossino)

Life after skating
After her skating career was over, Garossino moved to Calgary, AB, where she got into the profession of performance coaching with other athletes. After five years there, she moved to British Columbia. She is the aunt of producer, singer and artist Claire Boucher, also known as Grimes.

References

1965 births
Living people
Canadian female ice dancers
Figure skaters at the 1988 Winter Olympics
Olympic figure skaters of Canada
People from Didsbury, Alberta
World Junior Figure Skating Championships medalists